Chen Sanxin (born November 1957) is a former Chinese politician who spent his entire career in his home-province Hunan. He was party secretary of Xiangtan between 2010 and 2016, and chairman of Xiangtan People's Congress between 2015 and 2016. He was investigated by China's top anti-graft agency in May 2018, and received a sentence of 11 years in prison and fine of 1.5 million yuan ($234,150) for corruption.

Biography
Chen was born in Yongzhou, Hunan, in November 1957. He entered the workforce in 1981, and joined the Communist Party of China (CPC) in May 1985. He served in the Team 409 of Hunan Geological Bureau for a short while before entering Wuhan Institute of Geology (now China University of Geosciences, Wuhan) in 1983. After graduating in 1985, he continued to work in the Team 409 of Hunan Geological Bureau, where he was eventually promoted to its leader.

In August 1993, he became manager of Hunan Lingling Rock Foundation Engineering Company, concurrently serving as a party member of Hunan Provincial Geology and Mineral Resources Department and deputy director of Hunan Geology and Mineral Exploration and Development Bureau. In April 2000, he became deputy head of Hunan Provincial Natural Resources Department, rising to head in August 2006. In January 2010, he was transferred to Xiangtan and appointed party secretary, the top political position in the city, and concurrently holding the position of chairman of Xiangtan People's Congress since January 2015. In March 2016, he was assigned to the Hunan Provincial Committee of the Chinese People's Political Consultative Conference, where he was appointed deputy secretary-general, and served until May 2018, when he was placed under investigation for "serious violations of laws and regulations".

Downfall
On 11 May 2018, he was put under investigation for alleged "serious violations of discipline and laws" by the Central Commission for Discipline Inspection (CCDI), the party's internal disciplinary body, and the National Supervisory Commission, the highest anti-corruption agency of China. He was detained by the Hunan Provincial People's Procuratorate in August. On August 17, he was expelled from the Communist Party and dismissed from public office. On August 27, he was indicted on suspicion of accepting bribes. On October 31, he stood trial at the Intermediate People's Court of Zhuzhou on charges of taking bribes. He was charged with accepting money and property worth over 9.77 million yuan ($1.525 million) personally or through his family members. According to the indictment, he allegedly took advantage of his positions to seek benefits for others in examination and approval of qualification, contracting of engineering projects and payment of engineering funds between 2003 and 2017. On December 21, he was sentenced to 11 years and fined 1.5 million yuan ($234,150) for taking bribes. All his illegal gains will be confiscated and handed over to the State.

References

1957 births
Living people
People from Yongzhou
China University of Geosciences alumni
People's Republic of China politicians from Hunan
Chinese Communist Party politicians from Hunan